Tangrah (also Romanized as Tangrāh, Tang-e Rāh, Tang-i-Rāh, and Tang Rāh; also known as Tangar) is a village in Golestan Rural District, Loveh District, Galikash County, Golestan Province, Iran. At the 2006 census, its population was 1,078, in 292 families.

References 

Populated places in Galikash County